Thomas Rudborne was an English Benedictine monk of St Swithun's Priory, Winchester, and a chronicler writing in the middle of the fifteenth century.

His Historia Major covers the period 164 AD to 1138, and is centred on the Old Minster at Winchester. He cites carefully from English chronicles, Marianus Scotus and Martinus Polonus. He includes legendary material and hagiographical writing on Saint Swithun.

References
Antonia Gransden (1982), Historical Writing in England II, pp. 394–8

15th-century English historians
English Benedictines
English chroniclers
English Christian monks